Hans Maldonado (25 June 1956 – 19 July 1999) was an Ecuadorian footballer. He played in 20 matches for the Ecuador national football team from 1983 to 1985. He was also part of Ecuador's squad for the 1983 Copa América tournament.

References

1956 births
1999 deaths
Ecuadorian footballers
Ecuador international footballers
Association football defenders
Sportspeople from Esmeraldas, Ecuador